Archbishop Elias Joseph Gonsalves is the current archbishop of the Roman Catholic Archdiocese of Nagpur, India.

Early life 
Gonsalves was born on 4 July 1961 in Chulne, Vasai West, Vasai, Maharashtra, India. He studied B.A. in history and economics from Bombay University and community based development and leadership and counselling from Coady Institute at St. Francis Xavier University in Canada.

Priesthood 
Gonsalves completed his religious studies at St. Pius X Seminary in Mumbai and, on 11 April 1990, he was ordained a priest for the Roman Catholic Archdiocese of Bombay.

Episcopate 
Gonsalves was appointed bishop of the Roman Catholic Diocese of Amravati on 11 July 2012 and consecrated on 29 September 2012. He was appointed archbishop of the Roman Catholic Archdiocese of Nagpur.

See also 
 List of Catholic bishops of India

References

External links 

Living people
1961 births
21st-century Roman Catholic archbishops in India
People from Maharashtra